The Hard Way is the only studio album from American hip hop trio 213, which consisted of Snoop Dogg, Warren G and Nate Dogg. It was released on August 17, 2004 under Doggystyle Records, G-Funk Entertainment, Dogg Foundation, TVT Records.

Background
The reunion of the group first appeared as 213 in Warren G's The Return of the Regulator in the track "Yo' Sassy Ways". In 2003, Snoop Dogg, released his series of mixtapes, from which the second compilation Welcome to tha chuuch, Vol. 2 included the first version of "So Fly", which is a parody of the then chart-running hit single by Monica, So Gone. Missy Elliott, a co-producer of the song (with Spike & Jamahl), got to hear the tape and was very impressed by it. She agreed with Snoop to cede the right of the sample for the upcoming 213 project in exchange for their rapping on Tamia's "Can't Go for That" remix. In the end it came out to be the first unofficial radio single of The Hard Way.

Reception 

The Hard Way received mixed to positive reviews from music critics. Jason Birchmeier of AllMusic especially praised Warren G for "rapping tougher and more gangsta than usual." For HipHopDX, K.B. Tindal described the album as containing "[c]risp beats, sharp hooks, and straight lyrics." Rating the album three out of four stars, Rob Sheffield of Rolling Stone called 213 an "excellent G-funk-era-revival supergroup."

Grading the album with a C-plus, Michael Endelman of Entertainment Weekly compared the group to the 2003–04 Los Angeles Lakers, because the album "boasts marquee talent but doesn’t quite deliver the championship trophy." Matt Barone of RapReviews scored the album 5.5 out of 10 points for "overly generic left coast production and uninspired verses." Scott McKeating of Stylus rated the album six points out of 10, in part due to lackluster lyrics: "Snoop and Nate seem to have a problem going longer than a few bars without dropping some lines about 'dirty ass hoes.'" Rondell Conway of Vibe rated the album with 2.5 out of five due to 213 offering what he called "obsolete subject matter" despite "nostalgically offer[ing] its signature G-funk sound."

Commercial performance
The Hard Way debuted at number four on the US Billboard 200, selling 95,000 copies in its first week. The album debuted at top on the US Top R&B/Hip-Hop Albums chart.

"So Fly" was released on July 6, 2004 at first single from the album. The song reached at number 2 on US Billboard Bubbling Under Hot 100 Singles.

The official debut retail single was "Groupie Luv", which was also accompanied by a promo video. It was directed by Chris Robinson and was filmed in Snoop Dogg's own house (see also Still a G Thang). It is also the video debut for dancer Criscilla Crossland. "Groupie Luv" topped at number 26 on Billboard Hot 100 Airplay.

Track listing 

Notes
 "Twist Yo' Body" features backing vocals performed by Dion.
 "Rick James" (Interlude) features vocals performed by Dave Chappelle.

Sample credits
 "Keep It Gangsta" contains an interpolation of "Black Cow" performed by Steely Dan.
 "Groupie Luv" contains an interpolation of "Chameleon" performed by Herbie Hancock, Paul Jackson, Harvey Mason and Bennie Maupin.
 "Another Summer" contains excerpts of "Intimate Friends" performed by Eddie Kendricks.
 "Gotta Find a Way" contains excerpts of "Rejoice" performed by the Emotions.
 "Joysticc" contains an interpolation of "Juicy Fruit" performed by James Mtume.
 "Mary Jane" contains excerpts of "It's Time" performed by the Jungle Brothers.
 "MLK" contains an interpolation of "Riding High" performed by Faze-O.
 "My Dirty Ho" contains an interpolation of "The Rain" performed by Oran "Juice" Jones. It also samples Lacrimosa (Requiem) in Requiem (Mozart).
 "So Fly" contains excerpts of the recording "So Gone" performed by Monica and excerpts of "You Are Number 1" performed by The Whispers.

Personnel

Artists
 213 – primary artist (all tracks)
 Snoop Dogg – primary artist (all tracks)
 Nate Dogg – primary artist (all tracks)
 Warren G – primary artist (all tracks)
 LaToiya Williams – featured artist (track 8)
 Boki – featured artist (track 11)
 Dion – background artist (track 2)
 Dave Chappelle – skit (track 13)
Technical personnel
 Brian "Big Bass" Gardner – mastering
 Nate Oberman – engineer (tracks 3, 5, 7, 10, 11, 14–17, 19)
 Shon Don – engineer (tracks 2, 4, 6–9, 16–18, 20), mixing (track 8, 12, 14, 20)
 Geoff Gibb – engineer (track 12)
 Dave Aron – mixing (tracks 3–5, 7, 9–11, 15–18)
 Steve Baughman – mixing (track 2)
 DJ Pooh – mixing (track 6)
 Nomad – mixing (track 19)

Record producers
 Fredwreck – production (tracks 1, 13)
 Hi-Tek – production (track 2)
 Quaze – production (tracks 3, 14)
 B Sharp – production (tracks 4, 11, 15)
 Tha Chill – production (track 5, 11)
 DJ Pooh – production (track 6)
 Nottz – production (track 7)
 Kanye West – production (track 8)
 Josef Leimberg – production (track 9)
 Lil ½ Dead – production (track 10)
 Niggarochi – production (track 10)
 Terrace Martin – production (track 12)
 Marlon Williams – production (track 12)
 Michael Angelo – production (track 16)
 J-Hen – production (tracks 17, 18)
 Missy Elliott – production (track 19)
 Jelly Roll – production (track 20)
 Soopafly – additional strings (track 7)
Additional personnel
 Benjamin Wheelock – design
 Anthony Mandler – photography

Charts

Weekly charts

Year-end charts

Singles

Certifications

See also
List of number-one R&B albums of 2004 (U.S.)

References

External links 
 213 official page
 213 on Music Video Database
 E-jams

2004 debut albums
213 (group) albums
Albums produced by Hi-Tek
Albums produced by JellyRoll
Albums produced by Kanye West
Albums produced by Missy Elliott
Albums produced by Nottz
Albums produced by Terrace Martin
Albums produced by DJ Pooh
Albums produced by Battlecat (producer)
Albums produced by Fredwreck
Collaborative albums